Bachata may refer to:
 Bachata (music), a genre of Latin American music
Traditional bachata, a subgenre of bachata music
 Bachata (dance), a dance style from the Dominican Republic
 Bachatón, a hybrid bachata/reggaeton music style
 "Bachata" (song), a song by Lou Bega
 "La Bachata", a song by Manuel Turizo

See also
Bachata Rosa, the fifth studio album by Dominican singer-songwriter Juan Luis Guerra and his group 4.40
"Bachata en Fukuoka", single released by Juan Luis Guerra for his album A Son de Guerra
Bachata Number 1's (disambiguation), a number of compilation albums with the title